The 1952 Missouri Tigers baseball team represented the University of Missouri in the 1952 NCAA baseball season. The Tigers played their home games at Rollins Field. The team was coached by Hi Simmons in his 14th season at Missouri.

Led by All-Americans Don Boenker and Junior Wren, the Tigers advanced to the 1952 College World Series, losing to Holy Cross in the championship.

Roster

Schedule

Awards and honors
Don Boenker
First Team All-American

Junior Wren
First Team All-American

Kent Kurtz
Third Team All-American

References

Missouri Tigers
Missouri Tigers baseball seasons
Big Eight Conference baseball champion seasons
College World Series seasons
Missouri Tigers